Jekyll is a 2007 American horror film starring Matt Keeslar, Jonathan Silverman, Desmond Askew, Alanna Ubach, Siena Goines, Abigail Spencer, John Rubinstein, Josh Stewart and Roger Rose and written and directed by Scott Zakarin. It is a film adaptation of Dr. Jekyll and Mr. Hyde.

Plot
While doing research, Dr. Henry Jekyll creates a computer-generated alter-ego, Mr. Hyde, a creature of uncontrollable impulses who goes on a killing spree and tries to kill his own creator.

Cast
Matt Keeslar as Dr. Henry Jekyll/Mr. Hayde
Jonathan Silverman as Lanyon
Alanna Ubach as Michelle Utterson
Siena Goines as Christy
Desmond Askew as Ziggy Poole
Abigail Spencer as Talia Carew
John Rubinstein as Daniel Carew
Brian Palermo as John
Josh Stewart as Tommy
Steve Fogel as Dr. Johnathan Flagstaff
Aron Brumfueld as Mike
Joe Basile as Nick
Lisa Donahue as Lauren
Erin Cahill as Allison
Mike Baldridge as Dr. Derik Carew
Travis Aaron Wade as Matthew Carew
Chad Brokaw as Crazed Patient
Gathering Marbet as Celia Flagstaff
Daran Norris as Emcee
Petra Sprecher as Christy Monster
Lisa Picotte as Nurse
Jason Fanut as Bartender
Jess Harnell as Guy #1
Roger Rose as Guy #2
Brian Oerly as Eager Guy

External links
http://www.dvdverdict.com/reviews/jekyll.php 

https://web.archive.org/web/20100117052244/http://www.fanboyplanet.com/jekyll.php
http://www.filmjerk.com/news/article.php?id_new=375
http://www.allmovie.com/work/jekyll-450376

2007 films
Dr. Jekyll and Mr. Hyde films
2000s English-language films